Boophis andohahela is a species of frog in the family Mantellidae.
It is endemic to Madagascar, officially known only from Andohahela National Park and unofficially from Ranomafana National Park.
Its natural habitats are subtropical or tropical moist lowland forests, subtropical or tropical moist montane forests, and rivers.
It is protected in its currently known areas, but if it exists outside if it, it may threatened by habitat loss by agriculture, timber extraction, charcoal manufacturing, invasive eucalyptus, livestock grazing and expanding human settlements.

References

andohahela
Amphibians described in 1995
Endemic frogs of Madagascar
Taxonomy articles created by Polbot